Minor Premise is a 2020 American science-fiction thriller film directed by Eric Schultz in his directorial debut. He co-wrote the script alongside Justin Moretto and Thomas Torrey. The film stars Sathya Sridharan, Paton Ashbrook, and Dana Ashbrook.

The film premiered at the Fantasia International Film Festival on August 29, 2020.

Synopsis 
"Attempting to surpass his father's legacy, a reclusive neuroscientist becomes entangled in his own experiment, pitting ten fragments of his consciousness against each other".

Cast 
 Sathya Sridharan as Ethan
 Paton Ashbrook as Alli
 Dana Ashbrook as Malcolm
 Purva Bedi as Maggie
 Alex Breau as Timmy Fitzgerald
 E.J. Carroll as Dr. Joseph Lang
 Karron Graves as Lauren

Production 
The film was shot in the United States.

Release 
Minor Premise had its world premiere at the Fantasia International Film Festival on August 29, 2020, and it was released on VOD on December 4, 2020 by Utopia.

Reception

Critical response 
The site's critical consensus reads, "Minor Premise offers major enjoyment for sci-fi fans in search of an intelligent, grounded entry in the genre." On Metacritic, the film has a weighted average score of 66 out of 100, based on 6 critics, indicating "generally favorable reviews." Alan Zilberman of Washington City Paper reviewed the film positively, saying "With its stirring lead performance and ticking clock, this modest thriller is a major accomplishment." Daily Dead's Heather Wixson scored the film 4/5, stating "Minor Premise demonstrates an adept ability to marry smart, intellectually-driven storytelling that also has a bit of an emotional wallop to it as well."

References

External links 
 
 
 

2020 films
2020 directorial debut films
2020 thriller films
2020 science fiction films
American thriller films
2020s science fiction thriller films
2020s English-language films
2020s American films